Ngāti Whakahemo is a Māori iwi of New Zealand.

Its rohe (tribal area) covers the areas around Pongakawa and Pukehina, as well as Mōtītī Island, Motuhaku Island and Motunau Island.

The tribe traces its ancestry back to the ancestor Maruāhaira, who descended from the arrivals on the Tākitimu waka (migration canoe). Maruāhaira affiliated to Te Arawa and Mātaatua waka through marriages, and the iwi has maintained an historical association with Te Arawa.

In 2013, the iwi had a disagreement with Landcorp over the sale of publicly-owned farmland it said had been confiscated by the Crown.

Te Arawa FM is the radio station of Te Arawa iwi, including Ngāti Pikiao, Tūhourangi and Ngāti Whakaue. It was established in the early 1980s and became a charitable entity in November 1990. The station underwent a major transformation in 1993, becoming Whanau FM. One of the station's frequencies was taken over by Mai FM in 1998; the other became Pumanawa FM before later reverting to Te Arawa FM.

See also
List of Māori iwi

References